Villagrande Strisaili (Biddamanna Istrisàili in Sardinian language) is a comune (municipality) in the Province of Nuoro in the Italian region Sardinia, located about  northeast of Cagliari and about  northwest of Tortolì.

Villagrande Strisaili borders the following municipalities: Arzana, Desulo, Fonni, Girasole, Lotzorai, Orgosolo, Talana, Tortolì.

This area was identified as the very first Blue Zone due to its exceptional life expectancy. One study found that, unlike global statistics, males in this region live as long as females.

References

Cities and towns in Sardinia